Inga pilosula is a species of plant in the family Fabaceae. It is found in Brazil, the Caribbean, Bolivia and Peru.

References

External links

pilosula